Careful may refer to:
Careful (1992 film), 1992 Canadian drama film
Careful (2017 film), 2017 Malayalam thriller film
"Careful" (Guster song), 2003 song by Guster
"Careful" (Paramore song), 2009 song by Paramore
 Careful (The Motels album), 1980
 Careful (Boy Harsher album), 2019
Careful, a tower-building game by Ideal Toy Company, released in 1967

See also 
 
 Conscientious